Tinapayan, is a Filipino dish consisting of tapay (fermented cooked rice) and dried fish. It originates from the Maguindanao people. It is very similar to the more widespread northern dish burong isda, but differs in that the fish is dried first.

The process of preparing tinapayan is time-consuming, but results in a dish that can be preserved for a long time. The fish (usually snakehead or catfish) is first sun dried for three days, then it is covered in tapay (cooked rice fermented overnight in banana leaves) with ginger, chilis, and other spices and allowed to ferment further in a container for at least another week. The result is shredded and deep-fried in oil before serving. It is usually eaten with white rice.

See also
Lumlom
Balao-balao
Daing
Burong mangga

References

Fermented fish
Philippine seafood dishes